Yochanan Afek (born Yohanan Kopelovich, 16 April 1952) is an Israeli chess player, composer, trainer and arbiter. He is the only person to possess international titles at five different facets of chess, being an International Master, International Grandmaster of chess composition, International Arbiter, FIDE master in problem solving (2005), and International Judge for chess compositions. In 2002, he won Paris City Chess Championship (off contest).
Afek won the prestigious Art chess tournament in Amsterdam organized by the foundation for aristocratic art and culture (stichting Aristocratische Cultuur en Kunst) where various grandmasters participated.

The second chapter of Tibor Karolyi's 2009 book Genius in the Background is devoted to him.

Afek described pioneering Israeli master Moshe Czerniak as “my teacher”.

References

External links

Yochanan Afek – Articles – New In Chess

1952 births
Living people
Sportspeople from Tel Aviv
Chess International Masters
Israeli chess players
Jewish chess players
Jewish Israeli sportspeople
Chess coaches
Chess arbiters
Chess composers